The 55th Norwegian Biathlon Championships were held in Dombås, Oppland, Norway from 20 March to 24 March 2013 at the stadium Sparebank 1 skiarena, arranged by Dombås IL. There were a total of 8 scheduled competitions: individual, sprint, pursuit and relay races for men and women.

Ole Einar Bjørndalen did not participate in any races.

Schedule
All times are local (UTC+1).

Medal winners

Men

Women

References

External links
  

Norwegian Biathlon Championships
2013 in biathlon
2013 in Norwegian sport